Zhuogang is a town under the administration of Huangmei County, Hubei, China. , it administers five residential communities and 41 villages:
Zhuogang Community
Caiyun Community
Zhengjie Community
Yueguang Community
Guidun Community
Shilipu Village
Zhangshangwu Village
Caiwan Village
Fengshuling Village
Fanwan Village
Zhangdian Village
Hongtupu Village
Hongwan Village
Lilong Village
Bamaoshan Village
Yanfan Village
Liuwan Village
Huangzhulin Village
Chengguang Village
Liugeng Village
Wuju Village
Wuyuanba Village
Chashanju Village
Hupai Village
Gaoqiao Village
Wangzhongshi Village
Langkou Village
Lilinju Village
Yushixian Village
Huliuqiao Village
Wushapo Village
Yangliuhu Village
Xiawei Village
Baihudu Village
Jiangju Village
Zhangcheng Village
Xumi Village
Taohe Village
Chenzhongfan Village
Liuwei Village
Huba Village
Guiba Village
Dingzijie Village
Zhongluwan Village
Fengniu Village
Xuyu Village

References 

Township-level divisions of Hubei
Huangmei County